15 August  is a 2019 Indian Marathi-language drama film directed by Swapnaneel Jaykar and produced by Madhuri Dixit. The film features Rahul Pethe, Mrinmayee Deshpande and Adinath Kothare in the lead roles.

The film was released on 29 March 2019 on Netflix.

Plot 
In Mumbai, a crazy accident sets in motion a love story between Raju and Jui on India's Independence Day. Also, the residents of the chawl where the action takes place unite to help a little boy in trouble.

Cast 
 Abhishek Deshmukh as Omkar
 Mrunmayee Deshpande
 Namrata Kadam as Ninada's Mother
 Adinath Kothare
 Rahul Pethe
 Vaibhav Mangle as Gokhle

Release
The reception of Bucket List, in which Dixit appeared, prompted her to make a film in Marathi language. Instead of opening the movie in theaters, 15 August was shown to Netflix, who liked the idea. It was released on 29 March 2019.

References

External links 
 
 
 

2019 films
2010s Marathi-language films
Indian drama films
2019 drama films
Indian direct-to-video films
2019 direct-to-video films
Marathi-language Netflix original films